New Jersey Transit operates the following bus routes, which are mostly focused on long-distance travel, special-event service, or park-and-ride service.

Routes 
These 300-series routes operate from Northern Division garages as park-ride routes.

Northern Division
Assignments are noted in the table. The 351 and 353 are shared with Coach USA, the 308 is shared with the Central Division, and the 319 is listed in the Southern Division, from where most runs are based. All routes are express service. The full route is shown for each line except for branching.

Southern Division
These 300-series routes operate in southern New Jersey, primarily as long-distance local bus lines, along with the 319 Parkway Express. All lines are full-service lines with limited service. The 319 is shared with Meadowlands.

Former routes
This list includes routes that have been renumbered or are now operated by private companies.

 (there is a #340 and #346 but they were only shuttles from Atlantic City to Lakewood and Trenton)
[there are also a few other buses that don't usually appear like the 378, 375, 372, 364, and the 361 ]

External links 
New Jersey Transit - Bus
Unofficial New Jersey Transit bus map

References 

 300
Lists of New Jersey bus routes